The women's road race cycling event at the 2015 European Games in Baku took place on 20 June. It was won by Alena Amialiusik of Belarus.

Results

References

Women's road race
Euro